See Basilica of Our Lady of the Pillar (Buenos Aires) for the church in Buenos Aires

The Cathedral-Basilica of Our Lady of the Pillar is a Roman Catholic church in the city of Zaragoza, Aragon (Spain). The basilica venerates Blessed Virgin Mary, under her title Our Lady of the Pillar praised as "Mother of the Hispanic Peoples" by Pope John Paul II. It is reputed to be the first church dedicated to Mary in history.

Local traditions take the history of this basilica to the spread of Christianity in Roman Spain attributing to an apparition to Saint James the Great, the apostle who is believed by tradition to have brought Christianity to the country. This is the only reported apparition of Mary to have occurred before her believed Assumption.

Many of the kings of Spain, many other foreign rulers and saints have paid their devotion before this statue of Mary. Saint John of the Cross, Saint Teresa of Ávila, Saint Ignatius of Loyola, and Blessed William Joseph Chaminade are among the foremost ones. The Basilica of Our Lady of the Pillar is one of two minor basilicas in the city of Zaragoza, and is co-cathedral of the city alongside the nearby La Seo de Zaragoza. The architecture is of Baroque style, and the present building was predominantly built between 1681 and 1872.

History

Apparition of Pilar

 
According to ancient local tradition, soon after the crucifixion and resurrection of Jesus, Saint James was preaching the Gospel in Spain, but was disheartened because of the failure of his mission. Tradition holds that on 2 January 40 AD, while he was deep in prayer by the banks of the Ebro, the Mother of God appeared to him and gave a column of jasper and instructed him to build a church in her honor: "This place is to be my house, and this image and column shall be the title and altar of the temple that you shall build."{{<City of God, The Coronation, Book One, Part III, Book VII, Chapter XVI, Paragraph 352, Page 325. October 21, 2020>}}

First chapel
About a year after the apparition, James is believed to have had a small chapel built in Mary's honor, the first church ever dedicated to her. After James returned to Jerusalem, he was executed by Herod Agrippa in about 44 AD, the first apostle to be martyred for his faith. Several of his disciples took his body and returned it for final burial in Spain.
This first chapel was eventually destroyed with various other Christian shrines, but the statue and the pillar stayed intact under the protection of the people of Zaragoza.

Expansions

Romanesque church

Numerous churches have been built upon this site through the years. The tiny chapel built by Saint James later gave way to a basilica-like enclosure during Constantine I's time; subsequently being transformed into Romanesque, then Gothic then Mudéjar styles. The venerated shrines at Zaragoza date to the Christian Reconquest by King Alfonso I in 1118. A church in the Romanesque style was built under the pontificate of Pedro de Librana who is also credited with the oldest written testimonial to the Virgin at Zaragoza. A tympanum on the south wall of this Romanesque church still stands.

Gothic church

The Romanesque church was damaged by fire in 1434, and reconstruction began in the Mudéjar Gothic style. A Gothic-style church was built in the 15th century but only a few parts of it remain intact or were later restored, including the choir stand and the altarpiece in alabaster by Damián Forment.

Current church

The present spacious church in Baroque style was begun in 1681 by Charles II, King of Spain and completed in 1686. The early constructions were supervised by Felipe Sanchez and were later modified by Francisco Herrera the Younger under John of Austria the Younger. In 1725, the Cabildo of Zaragoza decided to change the aspect of the Holy Chapel and commissioned the architect Ventura Rodríguez, who transformed the building into its present dimensions of 130 meters long by 67 wide, with its eleven cupolas and four towers. The area most visited is the eastern part of the chapel, because this is where the Holy Chapel by Ventura Rodríguez (1754) is built, which houses the venerated image of the Virgin. Around the Holy Chapel are the vaults or domes painted with frescoes by Francisco Goya: The Queen of Martyrs and Adoration of the Name of God. The gilding and other ornamentation throughout the building were designed and overseen by Goya's father José. By 1718 the church had been vaulted over. However, it was not until 1872 that the final touches were put to these vaults, when the main dome and the final spire were finished.

During the Spanish Civil War of 1936–1939 three bombs were dropped on the church but none of them exploded. Two of them are still on show in the basilica.

Notable choirmasters include the Baroque composer Joseph Ruiz Samaniego.

Pillar and the image

The statue is wooden and 39 cm tall and rests on a column of jasper.
The tradition of the shrine of El Pilar, as given by Our Lady in an apparition to Sister Mary Agreda and written about in Mystical City of God, is that Our Lady was carried on a cloud by the angels to Zaragoza during the night. While they were traveling, the angels built a pillar of marble, and a miniature image of Our Lady. Our Lady gave the message to St James and added that a church was to be built on the site where the apparition took place. The pillar and the image were to be part of the main altar. The image was crowned in 1905 with a crown designed by the Marquis of Griñi, and valued at 450,000 pesetas (£18,750, 1910).

Layout
The building, which can be seen from the nearby Ebro River, is a large rectangle with a nave and two aisles, with two other all-brick chapels, thus giving the whole a typically Aragonese touch. It is illuminated by large oculi, characteristic of the monuments of the region from the 17th century onwards. Twelve enormous pillars support the vaults of the nave and aisles; the whole is topped by domes, as are the chapels.

The chapels within the basilica include:
Chapel of the Rosary
Chapel of Joachim
Chapel of Saint Lawrence (Lorenzo)
Chapel of Saint Pedro de Arbués
Chapel of Saint Braulio
Chapel of Saint Anthony
Chapel of Saint Joseph
Chapel of Saint Anna
Chapel of Saint John

Organ and music
The first organ was built in 1463 by Enrique de Colonia. In 1537, Martín de Córdoba built another organ with the intent to compete with the one at the La Seo.

Guillermo de Lupe and his son Gaudioso restructured the larger organ between 1595 and 1602; he had done the same for an organ in the Cathedral of the Savior of Zaragoza in 1577.

In 1657, there were several organs in the church, of many sizes and offering many possibilities. As a result, the musical activity reached a peak in the Spanish Golden Age; however, it began to decline toward the end of the 19th century.

In the Middle Ages, a minstrel accompanied singers with a dulcian. Polyphony in the Cathedral-Basilica of Our Lady of the Pillar was first documented in the mid-17th century, played by a "tenor" and a "contrabajón". In the late 1600s, an orchestra composed of minstrels agreed to work for the Church of Santa María la Mayor, the predecessor of the cathedral-basilica.

El Pilar and Spanish identity
The feast of Our Lady of the Pillar, celebrating the first apparition of Mary to Hispanic people, is on October 12. This coincides with the Día de la Hispanidad and the date of Columbus's discovery of the New World. Every nation of Hispanic colonial origin has donated national vestments for the fifteenth-century statue of the Virgin, which is housed in the chapel. Pope John Paul II praised El Pilar as "Mother of the Hispanic Peoples" during both his visits to the basilica.

It was declared Bien de Interés Cultural in 1904.

See also

Marian apparitions
Roman Catholic Marian churches
12 Treasures of Spain
 List of Bien de Interés Cultural in the Province of Zaragoza

References

 ANSÓN NAVARRO, Arturo y Belén Boloqui Larraya, «Zaragoza Barroca», en Guillermo Fatás Cabeza (coord.), Guía histórico-artística de Zaragoza, Zaragoza, Institución «Fernando el Católico»; Ayto. de Zaragoza, 2008, 4.ª ed. revisada y ampliada, págs. 249–327. Cfr. especialmente la sección «Basílica de Nuestra Señora del Pilar», págs. 287–322.— .
 «El Pilar», Gran Enciclopedia Aragonesa (en línea). [Consulta:22-7-2008]
 NOUGUÉS SECALL, Mariano, Historia crítica y apologética de la Virgen nuestra señora del Pilar de Zaragoza y de su templo y tabernáculo desde el siglo I hasta nuestros días, Madrid, Alejandro Gómez Fuentenebro, 1862.
 ORTIZ ALBERO, Miguel Ángel, Julián Pelegrín Campo y María Pilar Rivero Gracia, El Pilar desconocido, Zaragoza, Heraldo de Aragón, 2006, pág. 13.—D. L. Z-2597-06. 
 RINCÓN GARCÍA, Wifredo, El Pilar de Zaragoza, Zaragoza, Everest, 2000. .
 RISCO, Manuel, España Sagrada, t. XXX. Contiene el estado antiguo de la Santa Iglesia de Zaragoza [...] y una colección de las epístolas de San Braulio [...], Madrid, Antonio de Sancha, 1775.

Our Lady of the Pillar
Our Lady of the Pillar, Zaragoza
Zaragoza, Our Lady of the Pillar
Roman Catholic churches completed in 1686
Roman Catholic churches completed in 1961
19th-century Roman Catholic church buildings in Spain
Church buildings with domes
Shrines to the Virgin Mary
Tourist attractions in Zaragoza
Bien de Interés Cultural landmarks in the Province of Zaragoza
Baroque architecture in Aragon
Cultural tourism in Spain
17th-century Roman Catholic church buildings in Spain